Pichacani (hispanicized spelling) or Pichaqani (Aymara pichaqa a big needle, -ni a suffix, "the one with a big needle") is one of fifteen districts of the Puno Province in the Puno Region in Peru.

Geography 
Some of the highest mountains of the district are listed below:

Ethnic groups 
The people in the district are mainly indigenous citizens of Aymara descent. Aymara is the language which the majority of the population (80.95%) learnt to speak in childhood, 17.68% of the residents started speaking using the Spanish language (2007 Peru Census).

See also 
 Kutimpu
 Pharaquta
 Q'axilu

References